Donji Andrijevci is a municipality in Brod-Posavina County, Croatia. There are 3,709 inhabitants of which 96,6% declare themselves Croats (2011 census).

See also
Andrijevci railway station

References

Municipalities of Croatia
Populated places in Brod-Posavina County